Marco De Tullio (born 21 September 2000) is an Italian swimmer. He represented Italy at the 2019 World Aquatics Championships held in Gwangju, South Korea. He competed in the men's 400 metre freestyle event.

In 2018, he represented Italy at the Summer Youth Olympics in Buenos Aires, Argentina. In the boys' 400 metre freestyle event he won the silver medal and in the boys' 800 metre freestyle event he won the bronze medal.

In 2021, he won the bronze medal in the men's 4 × 200 metre freestyle relay event at the 2020 European Aquatics Championships held in Budapest, Hungary. In July 2021, he competed in the men's 400 metre freestyle and men's 4 × 200 metre freestyle relay events at the 2020 Summer Olympics held in Tokyo, Japan.

References

External links 
 

Living people
2000 births
Sportspeople from Bari
Italian male freestyle swimmers
Swimmers at the 2018 Summer Youth Olympics
European Aquatics Championships medalists in swimming
Swimmers at the 2020 Summer Olympics
Olympic swimmers of Italy
21st-century Italian people